This is a list of all the United States Supreme Court cases from volume 335 of the United States Reports:

External links

1948 in United States case law
1949 in United States case law